Peter Fischer (born 25 February 1954 in Oberstdorf) is a German former alpine skier who competed in the 1976 Winter Olympics.

References

External links
 Peter Fischer at Sports Reference sports-reference.com
 http://www.ski-db.com/db/profiles/peter_fischer_ger_fscpe.asp

1954 births
Living people
German male alpine skiers
Olympic alpine skiers of West Germany
Alpine skiers at the 1976 Winter Olympics
People from Oberstdorf
Sportspeople from Swabia (Bavaria)
20th-century German people